The United States Senate Youth Program (USSYP) is an annual scholarship competition sponsored jointly by the U.S. Senate and the William Randolph Hearst Foundation.

After a testing and interview process, two high school students are selected from each state, the District of Columbia, and the Department of Defense's overseas educational activities. In addition to a $10,000 scholarship, each receives a week-long trip to Washington, D.C.

History 

In 1962, senators Everett Dirksen, Hubert Humphrey, Tom Kuchel, and Mike Mansfield introduced S.R. 324 to the Senate floor, which created the program. The resolution was passed on May 17, 1962 and signed into law by John F. Kennedy. In 1981, the resolution was amended to provide for the participation of the Department of Defense Education Activity. The Hearst Foundation has provided funding for the program since its inception.

Organization and administration 

The United States Senate Youth Program (USSYP) is fully funded by the Hearst Foundation with the aim of discovering, equipping, and inspiring the next generation of local, state, and national leaders.

All student delegates to the United States Senate Youth Program are selected by state-level education officials – the United States Senate and The Hearst Foundations do not provide individual states’ applications or choose the delegates and alternates. Student delegates are usually selected by their State Department of Education through rigorous application processes.

Washington Week 

Selected student delegates receive a week-long trip to Washington, D.C. Each year, this trip, which is referred to as "Washington Week," provides an intensive study of government for the 104 students in each year's national delegation. While there, delegates attend meetings and briefings with senators, members of the House of Representatives, Congressional staff, the president, a justice of the Supreme Court, leaders of cabinet agencies, an ambassador to the United States, and members of the media. 

At the conclusion of Washington Week, student delegates in attendance receive a $10,000 undergraduate college scholarship.

Notable alumni 

The following are alumni of the Senate Youth Program:
Richard Burt, former United States Ambassador to Germany and chief negotiator of the Strategic Arms Reduction Treaty
Pete Buttigieg, former Mayor of South Bend, Indiana, 2020 Democratic presidential candidate and Secretary of Transportation.  
Chris Christie, former Governor of New Jersey
Susan Collins, U.S. Senator from Maine
Cory Gardner, former U.S. Senator from Colorado
Wayne Goodwin, chair of the North Carolina Democratic Party
Jaime Harrison, Chair of the Democratic National Committee
Robert Henry, former federal judge
David H. Leroy, former lieutenant governor of Idaho
Lee Isaac Chung, film director
Mack McLarty, former White House Chief of Staff
Karl Rove, former Senior Advisor to the President

References

External links

 United States Senate Youth Program
 United States Youth Alumni Association

Youth Program
Youth in the United States
Competitions in the United States
Hearst Communications
1962 establishments in the United States